The 1944 Hürtgen Forest Museum is located in Vossenack, in the municipality of Hürtgenwald, in the county of Düren, in the German state of North Rhine-Westphalia.

The 1944 Hürtgen Forest Peace Museum (Friedensmuseum Hürtgenwald 1944) was opened on 29 March 1983 in Kleinhau in a stone barn. Its aim was to recall the heavy fighting during the Second World War in the Battle of Hürtgen Forest, in which the Americans suffered a costly defeat. In setting up the museum, Konrad Schall from Winden gathered many exhibits: vehicles, documents, uniforms, and other artefacts that witness to the battles in the surrounding area.

Later, part of the exhibition was taken over by the municipality from Schall's legacy. It in turn transferred the exhibit to the Hürtgen Forest History Society (Geschichtsverein Hürtgenwald). On 15 September 2001, the current 1944 Hürtgen Forest Museum (Museum Hürtgenwald 1944 und im Frieden) was opened.

The peace museum is divided into the following themed rooms:
 Hürtgen Forest Local History
 The Siegfried Line in the area of the Hürtgen Forest
 Card room
 The Wehrmacht in the Hürtgen Forest
 The US Army in the Hürtgen Forest
 The Hürtgen Forest in the postwar period

References

External links 

 Official website
 Wissenschaftliche Bestandsaufnahme zum Museum, RWTH Aachen und Uni Köln (pdf; 1,9 MB)

Hürtgen Forest
Hürtgen Forest
Hürtgen Forest